The Whitehouse was a pub in a Grade II listed building in Duke Street, Liverpool, England. The side of the building had an image of a giant rat holding a marker pen by graffiti artist Banksy. In February 2010, the building sold for £114,000 at auction, and has since been turned into a restaurant called Petit Cafe du Coin, following the removal and sale of the rat mural.

References

Grade II listed buildings in Liverpool
Pubs in Liverpool
Grade II listed pubs in England
Former pubs in England